Shaykh Sulaymān Banārsī was a Mughal Empire official during the reign of emperor Jahangir. He served as the co-sardar of Sarkar Sylhet from 1617 until his death in 1620.

Background
Not much is known regarding Sulayman's background. He was a Shaykh and was said to have spent a lot of his earlier life in the landlocked city of Banaras in North India.

Life
The Subahdar of Bengal Subah, Qasim Khan Chishti, removed Mukarram Khan from his post as the Sardar of Sylhet out of dissatisfaction. The Subahdar replaced Mukarram with Mirak Bahadur Jalair, as Sylhet's chief sardar and Shaykh Sulayman Banarsi to govern Uhar and Taraf. Many junior mansabdars had jagirs in the Sarkar of Sylhet and so Qasim commanded them to assist Sulayman with his post in Sylhet.

Sulayman had a son called Tufan Bahadur, who was also a notable noble. Tufan accompanied Abdun Nabi on the expedition to Katghar.

Death
Sulayman died in 1620. When news of this reached the new Subahdar, Ibrahim Khan Fath-i-Jang, he ordered Mirza Malik Husayn and Raja Raghunath to inform Mirza Nathan to return to the Subahdar's court to be given sardarship of Sylhet if he pays 2,000 rupees. Raghunath and Husayn, the latter of whom was related to Nathan, sent a bailiff who took twelve days to reach Nathan. Nathan, who was busy preparing for an expedition to Hajo, accepted the Subahdar's orders and marched to Jahangirnagar. However, by the time Nathan had reached the capital, the Subahdar had already given the sardarship of Sylhet to Mirza Ahmad Baig, with Sulayman's son as a deputy sardar (not mentioned whether this was Tufan or not).

See also
Sabi Khan, his contemporary Faujdar of Bakla (Barisal)
History of Bengal
History of Bangladesh
History of rulers of Bengal

References

Mughal nobility
Rulers of Sylhet
Year of birth unknown
1620 deaths
17th-century Indian politicians
17th-century rulers in Asia
17th-century Indian Muslims
People from Varanasi